The Coventry City Player of the Year award is voted for annually by Coventry City's supporters, in recognition of the best overall performance by an individual player throughout the football season.

Since the inaugural award was made to Ernie Machin, seven players have won the award twice and one player has won the award three times. Just one winner has gone on to manage the club permanently; that being Gary McAllister - however Steve Ogrizovic, Trevor Peake and Richard Shaw have all been caretaker managers for short periods.

Voting mechanism
This award is voted for by the fans of the club. Toward the end of the season, fans are invited to vote, either by submitting a paper slip to the club's Ricoh Arena offices, or by email or text message, with the winner being the player that polls the most votes. A percentage of the votes from the 'Player of the Month' awards throughout the season also count towards the final votes for Player of the year.

List of winners

Wins by playing position

Wins by nationality

Other awards

References

Players Of The Year
Association football player of the year awards by club in England
Coventry-related lists
Association football player non-biographical articles